Nick Fury is a 2017 ongoing comic book series published by Marvel Comics. The series is written by James Dale Robinson and primarily drawn by ACO. It is the first series to feature Nick Fury Jr. as its main character.

Background
The artist ACO has stated that his art for the series is an attempt to recapture the feel of Jim Steranko's original Nick Fury, Agent of S.H.I.E.L.D. series from the 60s.

Publication history

Plot
S.H.I.E.L.D. agent Nick Fury Jr. is sent on a top-secret mission to the French Riviera. He'll need to outmaneuver the enemy as the complex dance of espionage begins when he encounters Frankie Noble.

Reception
The first three issues have received an average rating of 8.6 by 27 professional critics according to review aggregation website Comic Book Roundup.

In his review for IGN, Jesse Schedeen said the series tries to give Nick Fury Jr. a place in the Marvel Universe five years after his introduction, but that "Fury #1 is very much a case of style over substance" that is inspired by James Bond and Nick Fury: Agent of S.H.I.E.L.D.. Schedeen thought the art was great, but he did not feel any depth in Robinson's portrayal of Fury.

Matt Santori of Comicosity was more positive in his review, saying the book was Marvel's most charming adventure comic in years as well as having the prettiest art in a long while. He added that the artist team is good at violating conventional panel structure while still keeping the visual narrative comprehensible. Mark Peters of Paste said the comic's story is as simple as its art is complex and that it embraces Jim Steranko's mission to redefine the Nick Fury mythos from its roots. He goes on to say that the groundwork is laid for what he hopes may be a lengthy run of the series.

Pierce Lydon of Newsarama felt the main attraction of the book is its psychedelic art, stating that "Marvel says that artists aren't the ones selling books but ACO is the main draw here and it's easy to see why." The A.V. Club's Oliver Sava praised Rosenberg's coloring in his review. Kotaku's Charles Pulliam-Moore, praised the series, calling it a breath of fresh air compared to Marvel's other humorless contemporary series.

Prints

References

External links

 

2017 comics debuts
Nick Fury titles
Spy comics